Michael Kilgarriff (born 16 June 1937) is a British actor, author and pianist from Brighton. As an actor, he is well known for his rich voice and height. His film and television roles include The Dark Crystal (1982) as the General, and the Doctor Who serials The Tomb of the Cybermen (1967), Robot (1974–75) and Attack of the Cybermen (1985).

Career

Acting
He also appeared in the series as an Ogron (1973) and as the eponymous K1 Robot in the story Robot (1974–75).

He returned to play the K1 robot in the Big Finish Productions Bernice Summerfield audio adventure The Relics of Jegg-Sau. He also did voice work for The Twelve Tasks of Asterix as Obelix, the Jim Henson movie The Dark Crystal (1982) as SkekUng, the Garthim master (Named "The General" in the movie), was film director Joe Steiner in the UFO episode "Conflict", and played the part of the Green King in the BBC Television serial The Moon Stallion (1978). In 1979, he provided voices for several characters in the cult television adventure series "Monkey" when it was dubbed into English. These were invariably gruff, often villainous characters, including warlords and demons.

Music
Kilgarriff is a music hall enthusiast, and wrote what is considered the definitive guide to music hall songs: Sing Us One of the Old Songs: A Guide to Popular Song from 1860–1920 (Oxford University Press, 1998). This work lists thousands of influential songs by singer, lyricist and composer. Kilgarriff himself was a regular performer at the legendary Players' Theatre Club in Villiers Street, Charing Cross, London, where he took the part of chairman many times as well as performing comic songs, accompanying at the piano and directing.

Filmography

Film

Television

Video games

References

External links

1937 births
Living people
English male television actors
English male voice actors
People from Brighton